Eugnosta deceptana is a species of moth of the  family Tortricidae. It is found in southern Texas.

The wingspan is 13–16 mm. Adults have been recorded on wing from November to January, in March, May, June and August.

References

Moths described in 1907
Eugnosta